Nicholas Colasanto (January 19, 1924 – February 12, 1985) was an American actor and television director who is best known for his role as "Coach" Ernie Pantusso in the American television sitcom Cheers. He served in the United States Navy during World War II and later attended the American Academy of Dramatic Arts in the 1950s.

Early life
Born January 19, 1924, in Providence, Rhode Island, Colasanto attended Bryant University (now located in Smithfield, Rhode Island) and was a decorated veteran of World War II, during which he served as a coxswain in the United States Navy. Around 1954, he intended to work as an accountant for a company in Saudi Arabia. Instead, he attended American Academy of Dramatic Arts. He was of Italian descent.

Career
Colasanto is best known for his role as Coach Ernie Pantusso, a character in the television sitcom Cheers; he also directed episodes of many television series, including Hawaii Five-O, Starsky & Hutch, Bonanza, Columbo, and CHiPs. He also appeared in feature films, including The Counterfeit Killer (1968), Fat City (1972), and Alfred Hitchcock's Family Plot (1976).

Colasanto was in demand as an actor and director but in the mid-1970s he was diagnosed with heart disease, which was exacerbated by his alcoholism. After twenty years of alcoholism, he became an active member of Alcoholics Anonymous from March 31, 1976, and became sober in the same year. In the late 1970s, he began having difficulty securing directing jobs as his health was declining. His last major film role was as mob boss Tommy Como in Raging Bull (1980).

Colasanto was preparing to retire when the role of Coach Ernie Pantusso was offered to him on Cheers. Coach would become his best known role. By the third season of Cheers, Colasanto's health had seriously deteriorated. His fellow cast members noticed his weight loss, but Colasanto kept the severity of his illness secret. Shortly after the Christmas holiday in 1984, he was admitted to a local hospital for water in his lungs. Co-star Ted Danson later said Colasanto had difficulty remembering his lines during production of the season.

When Colasanto was released from the hospital in the week of January 28 – February 3, 1985, after a two-week stay, his doctor recommended he should not return to work. Although he appeared in the cold opening of the third-season finale episode "Rescue Me" (1985), Colasanto's last full episode was "Cheerio Cheers" (1985), which was filmed in late November 1984.

Death
Colasanto died of a heart attack at his home on February 12, 1985, at the age of 61. A memorial service was held in North Hollywood, Los Angeles, and attended by the full staff and cast of Cheers. In addition, over three hundred mourners, including castmate John Ratzenberger, attended the February 16 funeral Mass at Holy Cross Church in Providence. Colasanto is buried in Saint Ann Cemetery in Cranston, Rhode Island.

On April 19, 1985, Colasanto was posthumously awarded the Best Supporting Actor by Viewers for Quality Television, a non-profit organization that determined what was considered high-quality on television.

Colasanto's character was written out of the show as also having died. The fourth-season premiere episode, "Birth, Death, Love and Rice" (1985), deals with Coach's death and introduces Colasanto's successor Woody Harrelson, who played Woody Boyd. Colasanto had hung a picture of Geronimo in his dressing room; after his death it was placed on the wall in the bar of the Cheers production set in his memory. Near the end of the final episode of Cheers in 1993, eight years after Colasanto's death, bar owner Sam Malone (Ted Danson) walks over to the picture and straightens it.

Selected filmography

Film
 The Counterfeit Killer (1968) – Plainclothesman
 Fat City (1972) – Ruben
 The Manchu Eagle Murder Caper Mystery (1975) – Bert
 Family Plot (1976) – Constantine
 Raging Bull (1980) – Tommy Como, mob boss

Television
Actor
 Cheers (1982–1985) – Coach Ernie Pantusso, co-bartender (final appearance)

Director

 Run for Your Life (1965–1968)
 Ironside – "The Challenge" (1968)
 Hawaii Five-O – "A Thousand Pardons, You're Dead" (1969), "To Hell with Babe Ruth" (1969), "Just Lucky, I Guess" (1969), and "Most Likely to Murder" (1970)
 Bonanza – "Ambush at Rio Lobo" (1972)
 Hec Ramsey – "The Detroit Connection" (1973)
 Columbo – "Étude in Black" (1972) and "Swan Song" (1974)
 Nakia (1974) – "No Place to Hide" and "A Matter of Choice"
 Logan's Run – "Man Out of Time" (1977)
 The Name of the Game
 Starsky & Hutch
 The Streets of San Francisco
 CHiPs

References

Sources

Further reading
 Evory, Ann. Contemporary Newsmakers: 1985 Cumulation. Detroit: Gale Research Company, 1986. Print. .

External links 
 
 
 Nicholas Colasanto at the University of Wisconsin's Actors Studio audio collection

1924 births
1985 deaths
Male actors from Rhode Island
American male film actors
United States Navy personnel of World War II
American male television actors
American television directors
Bryant University alumni
Actors from Providence, Rhode Island
20th-century American male actors
United States Navy sailors
Burials in Rhode Island
American people of Italian descent
Military personnel from Rhode Island